Cycloxanthops novemdentatus, commonly referred to as the ninetooth pebble crab, is a small crab in the family Xanthidae.

Description 
C. novemdentatus is typically brown or red in color, but can also be purple. Individuals of this species often have dark or light markings on their shell which are still present after molting, however, shell color may change over time. This organism gets its common name from the two sets of anterolateral teeth on the front edge of its carapace, each consisting of nine teeth. The carapace can reach up to 3.75 inches in width.

Immature individuals can be distinguished from adults by the width of the third and sixth abdominal segments, length of marginal abdominal hair, sparse layer of hair on the swimmerets, and the presence of a structure known as a "lock mechanism" on males. After individuals reach approximately 6.5 mm in carapace width, sexual dimorphism is apparent due to the different size and shape of abdominal segments.

C. novemdentatus is the largest member of the family Xanthidae found in California.

Distribution and habitat 
C. novemdentatus can be found in the eastern Pacific Ocean, from Monterey, CA to Baja California, but is most abundant in the southernmost portions of coastal southern California.

C. novemdentatus lives in rocky intertidal and subtidal habitats to a depth of 240 m. Younger crabs are typically found in higher regions of the intertidal than adults.

Ecology

Diet 
C. novemdentatus has been observed cracking open and feeding upon purple sea urchins. It is also known to eat other crab species.

Defense 
When threatened, C. novemdentatus may freeze in place. It is thought that this is an attempt to remain undetected.

References

Xanthoidea
Crustaceans described in 1877